Nguyễn Thị Thu Hằng (born 21 March 1969) is a Vietnamese hurdler. She competed in the women's 100 metres hurdles at the 1992 Summer Olympics.

References

1969 births
Living people
Athletes (track and field) at the 1992 Summer Olympics
Vietnamese female hurdlers
Olympic athletes of Vietnam
Place of birth missing (living people)
21st-century Vietnamese women